Bultheel is a Huguenot surname, meaning a sieve for sifting flour. It is the surname of:
Adhemar Bultheel (born 1948), Belgian mathematician and computer scientist
Jan Bultheel, Belgian animated film director
Michaël Bultheel (born 1986), Belgian hurdle runner

References